A Cornish Romance is a 1912 British silent crime thriller film directed by Sidney Northcote and starring Wallett Waller, Dorothy Foster and O'Neil Farrell.

Cast
 Wallett Waller as Sir Ralph Chetwynd
 Dorothy Foster as Sybilla Chetwynd
 O'Neil Farrell as Jules Marx
 Sidney Northcote as Dark Davey
 Ruth Sampson as Miss Barton
 Fred Percy

References

External links

1912 films
Films directed by Sidney Northcote
Films set in Cornwall
British silent short films
British black-and-white films
1910s crime thriller films
British crime thriller films
1912 short films
1910s English-language films
1910s British films
Silent thriller films